William David Conn (October 8, 1917 – May 29, 1993) was an Irish American professional boxer and Light Heavyweight Champion famed for his fights with Joe Louis. He had a professional boxing record of 63 wins, 11 losses and 1 draw, with 14 wins by knockout. His nickname, throughout most of his career, was "The Pittsburgh Kid." He was inducted into the International Boxing Hall of Fame in the inaugural class of 1990.

Early career
Conn debuted as a professional boxer winning on July 20, 1934, against Johnny Lewis, via a knockout in round three.

Conn built a record of 47 wins, 9 losses and 1 draw (tie), with 7 knockout wins, before challenging for the World Light Heavyweight title. Along the way, he beat former or future world champions Fritzie Zivic, Solly Krieger and Fred Apostoli, as well as Teddy Yarosz and Young Corbett III.

On July 13, 1939, he met World Light Heavyweight Champion Melio Bettina in New York, outpointing him in 15 rounds and winning the World Light Heavyweight Championship as a result. Conn defended his title against Bettina and twice against another World Light Heavyweight Champion, Gus Lesnevich, each of those three bouts resulting in 15-round decision wins for Conn. Conn also beat former World Middleweight Champion Al McCoy and heavyweights Bob Pastor, Lee Savold, Gunnar Barlund and Buddy Knox in non-title bouts during his run as World Light Heavyweight Champion.

Joe Louis Era
In May 1941, Conn gave up his World Light Heavyweight title to challenge World Heavyweight Champion Joe Louis. Conn attempted to become the first World Light Heavyweight Champion in boxing history to win the World Heavyweight Championship when he and Louis met on June 18 of that year, and incredibly, to do so without going up in weight. The fight became part of boxing's lore because Conn held a secure lead on the scorecards leading to round 13. According to many experts and fans who watched the fight, Conn was outmaneuvering Louis up to that point. In a move that Conn would regret for the rest of his life, he tried to go for the knockout in round 13, and instead wound up losing the fight by knockout in that same round himself.
Ten minutes after the fight, Conn told reporters, "I lost my head and a million bucks." When asked by a reporter why he went for the knockout, Conn replied famously, "What's the use of being Irish if you can't be thick [i.e. stupid]?" In his long account in Sports Illustrated of the life and boxing career of Conn, sportswriter Frank Deford wrote that afterwards Conn would joke, "I told Joe later, 'Hey, Joe, why didn't you just let me have the title for six months?' All I ever wanted was to be able to go around the corner where the guys are loafing and say, 'Hey, I'm the heavyweight champeen of the world.' "And you know what Joe said back to me? He said, 'I let you have it for twelve rounds, and you couldn't keep it. How could I let you have it for six months?'"

In 1942, Conn beat Tony Zale and had an exhibition with Louis. World War II was at one of its most important moments, however, and both Conn and Louis were called to serve in the Army. Conn went to war and was away from the ring until 1946.

By then, the public was clamoring for a rematch between him and the still World Heavyweight Champion Louis. This happened, and on June 19, 1946, Conn returned into the ring, straight into a World Heavyweight Championship bout. Before that fight, it was suggested to Louis that Conn might outpoint him because of his hand and foot speed. In a line that would be long-remembered, Louis replied: "He can run, but he can't hide." The fight, at Yankee Stadium, was the first televised World Heavyweight Championship bout ever, and 146,000 people watched it on TV, also setting a record for the most seen world heavyweight bout in history. Most people who saw it agreed that both Conn and Louis' abilities had eroded with their time spent serving in the armed forces, but Louis was able to retain the crown by a knockout in round eight. Conn's career was basically over after this fight, but he still fought two more fights, winning both by knockout in round nine. On December 10, 1948, he and Louis met inside a ring for the last time, this time for a public exhibition in Chicago. Conn would never climb into a ring as a fighter again.

Personal life 

Billy married Mary Louise Smith, also from Pittsburgh. Billy did not get along with Mary's father, former major league baseball player for the Cincinnati Reds, Jimmy "Greenfield Jimmie" Smith. A fight broke out between them and Conn punched his father-in-law in the head and broke his hand, resulting in postponing the fight with Joe Louis. Frank Deford wrote colorfully about the kitchen brawl in his Sports Illustrated story "The Boxer and the Blonde".

Retirement
Conn appeared in a 1941 movie called The Pittsburgh Kid.  He maintained his boxing skills into his later years, and at 73 year old stepped into the middle of a robbery at a Pittsburgh convenience store in 1990 after the robber punched the store manager. Conn took a swing at the robber and ended up on the floor of the store, scuffling with him. "You always go with your best punch—straight left," Conn told television station WTAE afterward. "I think I interrupted his plans." The robber managed to get away, but not before Conn pulled off his coat, which contained his name and address, making the arrest an easy one. His wife said jumping into the fray was typical of her husband. "My instinct was to get help," she said at the time. "Billy's instinct was to fight."

Conn was a great friend of Pittsburgh Steelers owner Art Rooney.

As he became an older citizen, he participated in a number of documentaries for HBO and was frequently seen at boxing-related activities until his death in 1993, at the age of 75.

Conn was inducted into the International Boxing Hall of Fame in Canastota, New York.

In April 2017 Mary Louise Conn died, at 94.

In popular culture

 A portion of North Craig Street in the Oakland neighborhood of Pittsburgh is named Billy Conn Boulevard.
 Billy Conn is mentioned in the classic movie On the Waterfront. In the famous scene in the back of the cab—"I could have been a contender." Rod Steiger (playing Marlon Brando's brother) reflects on Brando's character Terry's early promise as a boxer with the words "You could have been another Billy Conn."
 Billy Conn is also mentioned in the 1966 Jack Lemmon and Walter Matthau classic comedy movie The Fortune Cookie. In the apartment scene where Lemmon asks Boom Boom (Ron Rich) "Where'd you learn that? Don't tell me, your father was a Pullman porter", for which Boom Boom replies "He was a fighter, light heavyweight. Once went rounds with Billy Conn."
 Conn played a character named Billy Conn in the 1941 film The Pittsburgh Kid, although it was not a biography.

Professional boxing record

See also
List of light heavyweight boxing champions

References

External links
 
 
 Billy Conn, 75, an Ex-Champion Famed for His Fights With Louis: May 30, 1993
Billy Conn - CBZ Profile

|-

|-

|-

1917 births
1993 deaths
American people of Irish descent
American Roman Catholics
Burials at Calvary Catholic Cemetery (Pittsburgh)
International Boxing Hall of Fame inductees
Light-heavyweight boxers
Boxers from Pittsburgh
World boxing champions
American male boxers